The 1987–88 daytime network television schedule for the three major English-language commercial broadcast networks in the United States covers the weekday and weekend daytime hours from September 1987 to August 1988.

Legend

 New series are highlighted in bold.

Schedule
 All times correspond to U.S. Eastern and Pacific Time scheduling (except for some live sports or events). Except where affiliates slot certain programs outside their network-dictated timeslots, subtract one hour for Central, Mountain, Alaska, and Hawaii-Aleutian times.
 Local schedules may differ, as affiliates have the option to pre-empt or delay network programs. Such scheduling may be limited to preemptions caused by local or national breaking news or weather coverage (which may force stations to tape delay certain programs to later timeslots) and any major sports events scheduled to air in a weekday timeslot (mainly during major holidays). Stations may air shows at other times at their preference.

Monday–Friday

Saturday

CBS note: Muppet Babies expanded to 90 minutes for this season to take the spot that would have been filled by Garbage Pail Kids; which had been pulled shortly before the season began due to criticisms from groups such as Action for Children's Television and American Family Association.

Sunday

By network

ABC

Returning series
ABC Weekend Special
ABC World News This Morning
ABC World News Tonight with Peter Jennings
All My Children
The Bugs Bunny and Tweety Show
The Care Bears Family
The Flintstone Kids
General Hospital
Good Morning America
Loving
One Life to Live
All New Pound Puppies
The Real Ghostbusters
Ryan's Hope
This Week with David Brinkley
Who's the Boss? 

New series
Animal Crack-Ups 
Growing Pains 
The Home Show
Little Clowns of Happytown
Little Wizards
Mr. Belvedere 
My Pet Monster

Not returning from 1986–87
American Bandstand (continued in syndication)
Bargain Hunters
Double Talk
Ewoks
Fame, Fortune and Romance
Webster 
The Wuzzles

CBS

Returning series
The $25,000 Pyramid
As the World Turns
The Bold and the Beautiful
Card Sharks
CBS Evening News
CBS Morning News
CBS News Sunday Morning
CBS Storybreak
Dennis the Menace
Face the Nation
Family Feud
Galaxy High 
Guiding Light
Jim Henson's Muppet Babies
Kidd Video  (moved from NBC)
The Morning Program
Pee-wee's Playhouse
The Price Is Right
Teen Wolf
The Young and the Restless

New series
Blackout
CBS This Morning
Hello Kitty's Furry Tale Theater
Mighty Mouse: The New Adventures
Popeye and Son

Not returning from 1986–87
The Berenstain Bears
Capitol
Dungeons & Dragons 
Hulk Hogan's Rock 'n' Wrestling
Land of the Lost 
The Puppy's Further Adventures 
Richie Rich 
Wildfire

NBC

Returning series
Disney's Adventures of the Gummi Bears
Alvin and the Chipmunks
Another World
Classic Concentration 
Days of Our Lives
Foofur
Kissyfur
Meet the Press
NBC News at Sunrise
NBC Nightly News
It's Punky Brewster 
Sale of the Century
Santa Barbara
Scrabble
The Smurfs
Super Password
Today
Wheel of Fortune

New series
ALF
Jim Henson's Fraggle Rock
I'm Telling!
The New Archies
Win, Lose or Draw

Not returning from 1986–87
Blockbusters
Family Ties 
It's Punky Brewster
Kidd Video  (moved to CBS)
Lazer Tag Academy
Main Street
Search for Tomorrow
Wordplay

See also
1987-88 United States network television schedule (prime-time)
1987-88 United States network television schedule (late night)

Sources
https://web.archive.org/web/20071015122215/http://curtalliaume.com/abc_day.html
https://web.archive.org/web/20071015122235/http://curtalliaume.com/cbs_day.html
https://web.archive.org/web/20071012211242/http://curtalliaume.com/nbc_day.html

United States weekday network television schedules
1987 in American television
1988 in American television